Haq Se is an Indian Hindi web series, produced and created by Viraj Kapur and Karan Raj Kohli for Ekta Kapoor's  video on demand platform ALTBalaji. The series stars Rajeev Khandelwal, Surveen Chawla and Parul Gulati .

The series is available for streaming on the ALT Balaji App and its associated websites since its release date.

Plot
The series revolves around four blood-bound sisters with four passionate dreams, all yearning for one thing: fulfillment. It is a modern-day story of dreams, desires, love, war and the eternal pursuit of happiness, set against the breathtaking beauty and unsettling unrest of Kashmir.

Life changed for Meher, Jannat, Bano, and Amal when their father's medicine factory was burnt in a riot. Their father was forced to leave for Siachen as an Army's doctor to cater to his family's needs. With military, political, and religious tension mounting by the moment, these girls are fighting hard to keep their passions alive.

Meher is a young and sensible woman who is working as a pediatric intern under Dr.Naushad Rizvi, a single father. In the past, she was in love with someone. But due to unknown reasons, the relationship failed. Therefore, she is very critical of love. Dr. Naushad Rizvi is a strict doctor who has zero interest in love. His wife left him for another man and since then he has been single-handedly raising his daughter Aliya. Jannat is a passionate and aggressive feminist, who writes for a newspaper by day and is an anonymous blogger by night. Bano is a calm and sensitive musician, who aspires to break the restrictions placed upon her by the society. Amal is a beautiful but hyperactive and rude girl who aspires to become an actress.

Cast
 Parul Gulati as Jannat Mirza 
 Surveen Chawla as Dr. Meher Mirza
 Rajeev Khandelwal as Dr. Naushad Rizvi
 Aanchal Sharma as Bahira Mirza    
 Nikessha Rangwala as Amal Mirza    
 Rukhsar Rehman as Rabiyah Mirza 
 Simone Singh as Fatima Khala
 Pavail Gulati as Tabish "Azi" Azad   
 Karanvir Sharma as Raghu Thapar 
 Ravi Khemu as Hashim Mirza
 Sahil Javid Khan as Saqib

References

External links
 Watch Haq Se on ALT Balaji website
 

2018 web series debuts
Hindi-language web series
ALTBalaji original programming
Indian drama web series
Kashmir conflict in fiction